Newton Vineyard is a wine estate outside the city of St. Helena in California's Napa Valley.

Newton was founded in 1977 by English businessman Peter Newton and his Chinese wife Su Hua.

History
Founded in 1977 by English businessman Peter Newton and his Chinese wife Su Hua, Newton was the first newly-developed vineyard on Spring Mountain in California's Napa Valley. The Newtons transformed one square mile of entirely undeveloped rolling hillside into one of Napa Valley's leading estates.

Newton Vineyards is part of Estates & Wines, the wine division of LVMH. LVMH acquired a majority stake in the company in 2001.

References

External links
 Official website

LVMH brands
St. Helena, California